Erik Larsson may refer to:
 Erik Larsson (athlete) (1888–1934), Swedish tug of war competitor
 Erik Larsson (ice hockey) (1905–1970), Swedish ice hockey player
 Erik Larsson (politician) (1918–2005), Swedish politician
 Erik Larsson (skier) (1912–1982), Swedish cross-country skier

See also
 Erik Larson (disambiguation)
 Erik Larsen (disambiguation)